Leftovers, also known as Turah, is a 2016 Indonesian drama film directed by Wicaksono Wisnu Legowo. It was selected as the Indonesian entry for the Best Foreign Language Film at the 90th Academy Awards, but it was not nominated.

Plot
Ten families go about their everyday lives in their remote Central Java village.

See also
 List of submissions to the 90th Academy Awards for Best Foreign Language Film
 List of Indonesian submissions for the Academy Award for Best Foreign Language Film

References

External links
 

2016 films
2016 drama films
Indonesian drama films
2010s Indonesian-language films